John Newland (1917–2000) was an American film director, actor, television producer, and screenwriter.

John Newland may also refer to:

John Newland (fl. 1384–1386), MP for Great Grimsby
John Newlands (Australian politician) (1864–1932), also known as John Newland, Scottish-born Australian politician

See also
John Newlands (disambiguation)